Mega2 (short for manipulation environment for genetic analysis) allows the applied statistical geneticist to convert one's data from several input formats to a large number output formats suitable for analysis by commonly used software packages.    In a typical human genetics study, the analyst often needs to use a variety of different software programs to analyze the data, and these programs usually require that the data be formatted to their precise input specifications.  Conversion of one's data into these multiple different formats can be tedious, time-consuming, and error-prone.  Mega2, by providing validated conversion pipelines, can accelerate the analyses while reducing errors.

Mega2 produces a common intermediate data representation using SQLite3, which enables the data to be accessed by other programs and languages.  In particular, the Mega2R R package converts the SQLite3 data into R data frames. Several R functions are provided that illustrate how data can be extracted from the data frames for common R analysis, such as SKAT and pedgene.  The key is being able to efficiently extract genotypes corresponding to chosen subsets of markers so as to facilitate gene-based association testing by automating looping over genes in the genome.  Another function converts to VCF format and another converts the data to GenABEL format. For more information about the Mega2R package, see here.

Mega2 has been used to facilitate genetic analyses of a wide variety of human traits, including hereditary dystonia, Ehlers-Danlos syndrome, multiple sclerosis, and gliomas.  A list of PubMed Central articles citing Mega2 can be seen here.

Mega2, which focusses on data reformatting, should not be confused with the MEGA, Molecular Evolutionary Genetics Analysis program, which focuses on molecular evolution and phylogenetics.

Input file formats 

Mega2 accepts input data in a variety of widely used file formats.  These contain, at a minimum, data about the phenotypes, the marker genotypes, any family structures, and map positions of the markers.

Output file formats 

Mega2 supports conversion to the following output formats.

Documentation 

The Mega2 documentation is available here in HTML format, and here in PDF format.

References

External links 
 Download Mega2
 Mega2 documentation (HTML)
 Mega2 documentation (PDF)
 Mega2 users Google Group
 Mega2 bitbucket repository
 The Mega2R R package

Free bioinformatics software